Harborcreek is an unincorporated community in Erie County, Pennsylvania, United States. Harborcreek has a post office with ZIP code 16421.

References

Unincorporated communities in Erie County, Pennsylvania
Unincorporated communities in Pennsylvania